James Forman (January 3, 1946January 9, 2022), known professionally as Mtume or James Mtume, was an American jazz and R&B musician, songwriter, record producer, activist, and radio personality.

He came to prominence as a jazz musician, working with Miles Davis between 1971 and 1975. Mtume's R&B group, also called Mtume, is best known for the 1983 R&B hit song "Juicy Fruit", which has been repeatedly sampled. Mtume the band also had a top-five R&B hit with the single "You, Me, and He".

Life and career
Mtume was born James Forman on January 3, 1946, in Philadelphia, Pennsylvania. He was the son of jazz saxophonist Jimmy Heath, and was raised by his mother, Bertha Forman, and his stepfather, a Philadelphia local jazz pianist, James "Hen Gates" Forman.

He grew up in a musical environment with jazz musicians frequenting his parents' house. He learned to play piano and percussion; however, from his teenage years he was pursuing athletics as a swimmer, having achieved the title of the first black Middle Atlantic AAU champion in the backstroke, and in 1966 he entered Pasadena City College on a swimming scholarship.

In 1966, Mtume joined the US Organization, a Black empowerment group founded by Hakim Jamal and Maulana Karenga, while a student at Pasadena City College. Mtume received his name, which means "messenger" in Swahili, from Karenga who gave members of the organization names to match their personality traits. He was part of the group which celebrated the first Kwanzaa in 1966. In 1967 he co-edited The Quotable Karenga with Clyde Halisi, which has been called "the best expression of Karenga's ideas". Mtume left the US Organisation in 1969.

Mtume's professional debut was on Kawaida, a 1969 album by his uncle, Albert Heath. His first recording released under his own name was Alkebu-lan: Land of the Blacks, recorded live at The East, a Black nationalist community arts and education center in Brooklyn, and released on Strata-East Records. Both albums were intended to merge free jazz and cultural identity. 

After his return from the West Coast he moved to New York City and had his first gigs as a sideman for McCoy Tyner (Asante album), Freddie Hubbard, and Miles Davis, whose group he wound up joining and playing in for the next few years.

With fellow Mtume band member Reggie Lucas, he won the Grammy Award for Best R&B Song for writing and producing Stephanie Mills' top-ten hit "Never Knew Love Like This Before", for which she also won a Grammy for Best Female R&B Vocal Performance.

In 1994, Mtume created music for the show New York Undercover while also creating musical appearance opportunities for other artists on the show.

In July 2018, Mtume filed a lawsuit against Sony Music/Epic Records, hoping to reclaim the rights for two albums and his hit single "Juicy Fruit". Mtume claimed to hold the sole copyright of these recordings, while Sony insisted that the albums were made for hire.

Personal life and death
Mtume was the father of music producers Damu Mtume and Fa Mtume. He died in South Orange, New Jersey on January 9, 2022, at the age of 76. His death occurred six days following his birthday.

Discography

As leader
Alkebu-Lan: Land of the Blacks (Strata-East, 1972) - with Mtume Umoja Ensemble (Carlos Garnett - Tenor & Flute, Leroy Jenkins - Violin, Gary Bartz- Alto and Soprano Sax, Stanley Cowell - Piano, Buster Williams - Bass, Billy Hart - Drums, and Joe Lee Wilson, Eddie Micheaux, and Andy Bey - Vocals.  Yusef Iman and Weusi Kuumba - Poets.
Rebirth Cycle (Third Street, 1977) - with Jean Carn, Stanley Cowell, Dee Dee Bridgewater, Jimmy Heath, Cecil McBee, Leroy Jenkins, and Azar Lawrence.
Kiss This World Goodbye (Epic, 1978) - with Mtume
In Search of the Rainbow Seekers (Epic, 1980) - with Mtume
Juicy Fruit (Epic, 1983) - with Mtume 
You, Me and He (Epic, 1984) - with Mtume 
Theater of the Mind (Epic, 1986) - with Mtume

As sideman
With Gato Barbieri
Under Fire (Flying Dutchman, 1971 [1973])
Bolivia (Flying Dutchman, 1973)
With Miles Davis
On the Corner (Columbia, 1972) 
In Concert: Live at Philharmonic Hall (Columbia, 1973)
Big Fun (Columbia, 1974) 
Get Up with It (Columbia, 1974) 
Dark Magus (Columbia, 1974)
Agharta (Columbia, 1975) 
Pangaea (Columbia, 1975)
The Complete On the Corner Sessions (Columbia, 2007)
Miles Davis at Newport 1955-1975: The Bootleg Series Vol. 4 (Columbia Legacy, 2015)
With Art Farmer
Homecoming (Mainstream, 1971)
With Carlos Garnett
Black Love (Muse, 1974)
With Albert Heath
Kawaida (1969)
With Jimmy Heath
The Gap Sealer (Muse, 1973)
The Time and the Place (Landmark, 1974 [1994])
With Eddie Henderson
Heritage (Blue Note, 1976)
Comin' Through (Capitol, 1977)
Mahal (Capitol, 1978)
with Harold Land
A New Shade of Blue (Mainstream, 1971)
With Azar Lawrence
Bridge into the New Age (Prestige, 1974)
With Lonnie Liston Smith
Astral Traveling (Flying Dutchman, 1973)
With James Spaulding
James Spaulding Plays the Legacy of Duke Ellington (Storyville, 1977)
With McCoy Tyner
Asante (Blue Note, 1970)Handscapes 2 (Strata-East, 1975)
With Buddy TerryAwareness (Mainstream, 1971)Pure Dynamite (Mainstream, 1972)
 With Sonny RollinsNucleus (Milestone, 1975)

As composer
 "The Closer I Get to You" (1977) written with Reggie Lucas. Performed by Roberta Flack and Donny Hathaway on Blue Lights in the Basement. Atlantic Records, 1977. 
 "Back Together Again" (1980) written with Reggie Lucas. Performed by Roberta Flack and Donny Hathaway also.

As producer (with Reggie Lucas)
Stephanie Mills – What Cha' Gonna Do with My Lovin' (20th Century, 1979)
Phyllis Hyman – You Know How to Love Me (Arista, 1979)
Rena Scott – Come On Inside (Buddah, 1979)
Stephanie Mills – Sweet Sensation (20th Century, 1980)
Gary Bartz – Bartz (Arista, 1980)
Stephanie Mills – Stephanie (20th Century, 1981)
Marc Sadane – One Way Love Affair (Warner Bros., 1981)
Stephanie Mills – Tantalizingly Hot (Casablanca, 1982)
Lou Rawls – Now Is the Time (Epic, 1982)
The Spinners – Can't Shake This Feelin' (Atlantic, 1982)
Marc Sadane – Exciting (Warner Bros., 1982)The Best of Mtume & Lucas (Expansion, 2004) – compilation

Produced by James Mtume
Roy Ayers - You Might Be Surprised (Columbia Records, 1985)
LeVert – Bloodline (Atlantic Records, 1986)
Tyrone Brunson - The Method (MCA, 1986)
Tawatha Agee - Welcome to My Dream (Epic, 1987)
Nu Romance Crew – Tonight (EMI America, 1987)
Tease – Remember (Epic, 1988)
Sue Ann Carwell - Blue Velvet (MCA, 1988)
Kiara – To Change and/or Make a Difference (Arista, 1989)
Freeze Factor - Chill'' (Epic, 1989)

References

External links
 
 
 
 James Mtume 2015 Interview at Soulinterviews.com 
 RBMA Tokyo 2014 Lecture

1946 births
2022 deaths
African-American male singers
American multi-instrumentalists
American rhythm and blues singers
Grammy Award winners
Musicians from Philadelphia
Strata-East Records artists